Otto Regenbogen (14 February 1891 – 8 November 1966) was a German linguist and scholar.

Classical philologists
Linguists from Germany
1891 births
1966 deaths
People from Środa Śląska
People from the Province of Silesia
Members of the German Academy of Sciences at Berlin
20th-century linguists